The Egna Spring Trophy, formerly the Gardena Spring Trophy (through 2016), is an annual international figure skating competition. It is held every spring in Val Gardena in Italy. Medals are awarded in men's and ladies' singles and sometimes in other disciplines. Since its inception in 1990, the event has included a junior-level competition. Advanced novice categories were added in 2006 and senior categories in 2011. An ice dance competition, the Egna Dance Trophy, was first held in February 2018.

Senior medalists

Men

Ladies

Pairs

Ice dance

Junior medalists

Men

Ladies

Pairs

Ice dance

Novice medalists

Boys

Girls

Pairs

Ice dance

References

External links
 Gardena Spring Trophy

Figure skating competitions
International figure skating competitions hosted by Italy